The Cunningham Clock Tower  in Peshawar, Khyber-Pakhtunkhwa, Pakistan, was built in 1900, "in commemoration of the Diamond Jubilee of Her Majesty the Queen Empress". The tower was named after Sir George Cunningham, former British governor and political agent in the province.

History
Designed by James Strachan, the Municipal Engineer of Peshawar, the foundation stone was laid by the George Cunningham, Governor of the North West Frontier Province (now Khyber Pakhtunkhwa) in 1898. It was opened to the public in 1900 to commemorate the Diamond Jubilee of Queen Victoria. The construction of the building was funded by Balmukand family.

The building was damaged in the 1965 indo-pak war when an Indian plane mistook it for the airstrip of Peshawar airport. It was then rebuilt in 2003 by Haroon Bilour.

Structure
The tower is 31 feet in diameter. Its base is 13 by 4 metres (43 ft × 13 ft) and stands 26 metres (85 ft) tall at the Ghanta Ghar Chowk (“Clock Tower Square”).

Gallery

See also
List of clock towers in Pakistan

References

Tourist attractions in Peshawar
Clock towers in Pakistan
Buildings and structures in Peshawar